The 1934 Tulane Green Wave football team represented Tulane University as a member of the Southeastern Conference (SEC) during the 1934 college football season. Led by third-year head coach  Ted Cox, the Green Wave played their home games at Tulane Stadium in New Orleans. Tulane finished the season with an overall record of 10–1 and a mark of 8–0 in conference play, sharing the SEC title with Alabama. Tulane  was invited to the Sugar Bowl, where they defeated Temple.

Schedule

References

Tulane
Tulane Green Wave football seasons
Southeastern Conference football champion seasons
Sugar Bowl champion seasons
Tulane Green Wave football